Shiklovo is a rural locality (a village) in Karinskoye Rural Settlement, Alexandrovsky District, Vladimir Oblast, Russia. The population was 5 as of 2010. There are 2 streets.

Geography 
Shiklovo is located 16 km south of Alexandrov (the district's administrative centre) by road. Korovino is the nearest rural locality.

References 

Rural localities in Alexandrovsky District, Vladimir Oblast